This is a list of mosques in Iraq. There are 7,000 Sunni mosques and 3,500 Shia mosques in Iraq as a whole. According to the Office of Waqf and Sunnah in Iraq, in the capital city of Baghdad, there are 912 Jama Masjids which conduct Friday Prayer and 149 smaller mosques which only hold regular daily prayers. In Falujah, there are 970 mosques according to the 2009 data.

See also

 Islam in Iraq
 Lists of mosques
 List of mosques in Baghdad

References 

Iraq
 
Mosques